= Browns Island (San Joaquin County) =

Island in California

- Location within Sacramento-San Joaquin River Delta Location within California Location within the United States

Geography
- Location: Northern California
- Coordinates: 37°57′37″N 121°21′21″W
- Adjacent to: Sacramento–San Joaquin River Delta
- Highest elevation: 13 ft (4 m)

Administration
- United States
- State: California
- County: San Joaquin

Browns Island is a former island in the Sacramento–San Joaquin River Delta, now connected to the mainland. It is part of San Joaquin County, California. Its coordinates are 37°57′37″N 121°21′21″W, and the United States Geological Survey measured its elevation as 13 ft (4.0 m) in 1995. It appears on a 1913 USGS map of the area; its former location is labeled "Browns Island" on the 2015 edition of the map.
